Graves of Valor is an American death metal band formed in 2005, hailing from Florence, South Carolina, United States.  They signed a deal with Relapse Records and have since released their only  album, Salarian Gate, on May 26, 2009.

History
Graves of Valor was formed in December 2005 in Florence, South Carolina, with their original name being "From Graves of Valor." After a few line-up changes, ex-Through the Eyes of the Dead members Jeff Springs, Richard Turbeville, and Dayton Cantley joined up with bassist David Hasselbring and Damon Welch to solidify the band's most recent line-up.

The band recorded their debut album, Salarian Gate, in Tampa, Florida at Mana Recording Studios with engineer Brian Elliott. The band toured as part of the 2009 Relapse Contamination Tour alongside fellow label-mates Obscura and Abysmal Dawn in April and May leading up to the official Salarian Gate US release date. Graves of Valor also went on a three-week run supporting Salt the Wound in September 2009 in support of their latest release with Knights of the Abyss, and Within the Ruins.

After being unable to secure a full line-up and full-time drummer, Graves of Valor disbanded. The band has recently re-formed with Jeff Springs and Dayton Cantley under the new name Ditch Eel. Their musical style has changed from death metal to more Southern inspired metal.

Members
Current
 Richard Turbeville – Guitar
 Damon Welch – Vox
 Justin Brown – Guitar
 Jeff Pence – Drums
 Ryan Blum – Bass
Former
 David Hasselbring – Bass
 Jeff Springs – Guitar
 Dayton Cantley – Drums

Discography

as From Graves of Valor
 Famine EP (Tragic Hero, 2007)

as Graves of Valor
 Salarian Gate (Relapse, 2009)

References

External links
 Official Myspace
 Graves of Valor @ Relapse

Musical groups from South Carolina
American death metal musical groups
American deathcore musical groups
Musical quintets
Heavy metal musical groups from South Carolina
Musical groups established in 2005
2005 establishments in South Carolina
Tragic Hero Records artists
Metalcore musical groups from South Carolina